Desperation Band is a worship band led by Jon Egan, and part of the worship ministry of New Life Church in Colorado Springs, Colorado.

The band has been featured on the main stage at Creation East and Kingdom Bound, and has led worship in the Worship Tent at both Creation East and KingdomBound. They have also been featured on Teen Mania's Acquire the Fire tour dates in stadiums around the country. Their albums, recorded live at New Life Church, appear on Integrity’s Vertical Music label and feature "high-energy, passionate new worship songs that convey the hunger of their generation for God."

Career
Desperation Band was first formed in 2001, when New Life Church pastor David Perkins suggested that Jon Egan, Jared Anderson, and Glenn Packiam play together with their bands at the first Desperation Conference. Held annually in July, Desperation Conferences draw thousands of college and high school students.

The song "I Am Free", written by band co-founder Jon Egan and recorded by the band for 2004's From the Rooftops, was later covered by the Newsboys, for whom it became a hit single.

Discography
 Desperation (2003)
 From the Rooftops (2004)
 Who You Are (2006)
 Sessions & Remixes EP (2007)
 Everyone Overcome (2007)
 Light Up the World (2009)
 Update: Live (2011)
 Center of it All (April 2012)
 Banner (September 30, 2014)

Notes

References
"Desperation Staff". Published by New Life Church. Retrieved 2008-08-07.
"New Life Worship: Who We Are". Published by New Life Church. Retrieved 2008-08-07.
"Review on Christianity Today". Published by Christianity Today. Retrieved 2008-08-07.
"Label Artist Bio". Published by Integrity Music. Retrieved 2008-08-07.
"Desperation Conference". Published by New Life Church. Retrieved 2008-08-07.
"Glenn Packiam Bio". Self Published. Retrieved 2008-08-07.
"". Published by Desperationband.com. Retrieved 2014-04-30

External links
  (appears defunct)
 Desperation Conferences
 Official Desperation Band YouTube Site

American Christian rock groups
Musical groups established in 2002
2002 establishments in Colorado